The Suffolk Goobers were a minor league baseball team based in Suffolk, Virginia. From 1948 to 1951, the Goobers played as members of the Virginia League, winning the 1948 league pennant. The Suffolk Goobers hosted minor league home games at Peanut Park.

History
The "Goobers" were preceded in minor league play by the 1921 Suffolk Wildcats of the Class B level Virginia League.

In 1948, the Suffolk Goobers became members of the reformed Virginia League, which formed as a six–team, Class D level league. The Blackstone Barristers, Emporia Nationals, Franklin Cubs, Lawrenceville Cardinals and Petersburg Generals joined Suffolk in beginning league play on April 23, 1948.

The Suffolk use of the "Goobers" moniker corresponds with peanut agriculture in the region in the era. Suffolk was self–nicknamed as the "Peanut Capitol of the World." The term was known to be used as a nickname for peanuts.

In their first season of play, the Suffolk Goobers won the 1948 Virginia League pennant. The Goobers ended the regular season with a record of 83–52, finishing 1st in the standings, 7.5 games ahead of the 2nd place Blackstone Barristers. Bill Steinecke served as manager in leading the team to the league pennant. In the 1st round of the four–team playoffs, the Petersburg Generals defeated Suffolk 4 games to 2, ending their season. Pitcher Cecil Hutson of Suffolk led the league with 23 wins.

Playing under returning manager Bill Steineke and Paul Badgett, the Goobers qualified for the 1949 Virginia League playoffs. Suffolk finished the 1949 season with a record of 57–65, placing 4th in the Virginia League regular season standings. The Goobers finished the regular season 20.0 games behind the 1st place Franklin Kildees. In the playoffs, Franklin defeated the Goobers 4 games to 1.

In 1950, the Suffolk Goobers placed 6th in the Virginia League regular season standings, missing the playoffs. With a record of 50–79, Suffolk ended the regular season in last place, with the Goobers playing under manager Buster Kinard. Suffolk finished 21.5 games behind the 1st place Emporia Nationals.

In their final season, the 1951 Goobers returned to the playoffs with a 4th place finish in the league standings. The Suffolk Goobers ended the Virginia League  regular season with a record of 56–62, finishing 23.5 games behind the 1st place Colonial Heights-Petersburg Generals. In the playoffs, Colonial Heights-Petersburg defeated Suffolk Goobers 4 games to 1, in the last games for the franchises. Buster Kinard of Suffolk won the league batting title, hitting .378.

The Virginia League permanently folded as a minor league following the 1951 season. Suffolk, Virginia has not hosted another minor league team.

The ballpark
The Suffolk Goobers hosted home minor league home games at Peanut Park. The ballpark was located next to the Suffolk Peanut Company, giving it its name. In its history, the site was also known as Smith Street Park, Athletic Park and League Park, with the capacity being expanded from 2,500 in 1948 to 5,000 in 1950. Peanut Park is still in use today as a public park with a ballfield. The location is 308 South Saratoga Street.

Timeline

Year–by–year records

Notable alumni

Vern Freiburger (1948–1949)
Eddie Kasko (1950)
Bill Steinecke (1948–1948, MGR)
Red Treadway (1951, MGR)

See also
Suffolk Goobers players

References

External links
Suffolk - Baseball Reference

Suffolk, Virginia
Defunct minor league baseball teams
Professional baseball teams in Virginia
Defunct baseball teams in Virginia
Baseball teams disestablished in 1951
Baseball teams established in 1948
Virginia League teams